Gouera is a town in the Soubakaniédougou Department of Comoé Province in south-western Burkina Faso. The town has a population of 1,924.

References

External links
Satellite map at Maplandia.com

Populated places in the Cascades Region
Comoé Province